Symmetrodes sciocosma is a moth in the subfamily Arctiinae. It was described by Edward Meyrick in 1888. It is found in Australia, where it is found in the Northern Territory, Queensland and New South Wales.

The wingspan is about 20 mm. The forewings are brown with yellow veins and edges.

References

Moths described in 1888
Lithosiini
Moths of Australia